The 1977 New Zealand Open was a men's professional tennis tournament played on outdoor grass courts in Auckland, New Zealand that was held from 10 January through 16 January 1977. First-seeded Vijay Amritraj won the singles title.

Finals

Singles

 Vijay Amritraj defeated  Tim Wilkison 7–6, 5–7, 6–1, 6–2
 It was Amritraj's 1st title of the year and the 14th of his career.

Doubles
 Chris Lewis /  Russell Simpson defeated  Peter Langsford /  Jonathan Smith 7–6, 6–4
 It was Lewis's 1st title of the year and the 1st of his career. It was Simpson's 1st title of the year and the 2nd of his career.

References

External links
 ATP – tournament profile

Heineken
ATP Auckland Open
1977 Grand Prix (tennis)
January 1977 sports events in New Zealand